Serniabat Sadiq Abdullah is a Bangladeshi politician and businessman. He was elected as mayor of the Barisal City Corporation in 2018 city election. He is a son of Awami League politician Abul Hasanat Abdullah and grandson of Abdur Rab Serniabat.

Early life
Abdullah was born to Abul Hasanat Abdullah and Shahan Ara Abdullah in Barisal. He has no formal education and identifies as self educated.

Career
Abdullah was nominated by Awami League to contest the Barisal City Corporation in 2018. He was the joint secretary of Barisal City unit of Awami League. He skipped a meeting with voters organized by Citizens for Good Governance (SHUJAN).

Abdullah received 107,353 votes while his nearest rival, Mazibor Rahman Sarwar of Bangladesh Nationalist Party, received 13,135 votes. The election was boycotted by the candidates of Communist Party of Bangladesh and Islami Andolon Bangladesh who alleged vote rigging. He was sworn in office by Prime Minister Sheikh Hasina at the Prime Minister's Office in Dhaka. Before the elections, hundreds of Bangladesh Nationalist Party activists were detained.

Abdullah was appointed General Secretary of Barisal City unit of Awami League.

Three journalists of Barishal Khobor, an online portal, were detained by Bangladesh Police after they took a video of Abdullah and his family on a walk. They were beaten in custody according to locals and charged under the Digital Security Act on 14 September 2020.

References

Mayors of Barishal

Living people
People from Barisal District
Bangladeshi businesspeople
Awami League politicians
1973 births
Sheikh Mujibur Rahman family
Bangladeshi people of Arab descent